San Saturnino is a 20th-century parochial church and titular church in northern Rome, dedicated to Saturninus the Martyr (died on the Via Salaria in AD 304).

History 

The church was built in 1935–1940. The relics of Saint Saturninus are interred under the high altar.

On 21 October 2003, it was made a titular church to be held by a cardinal-priest.

Cardinal-protectors
 Rodolfo Quezada Toruño (2003–2012)
 John Onaiyekan (2012–present)

References

External link

Titular churches
San Saturnino
Roman Catholic churches completed in 1940
20th-century Roman Catholic church buildings in Italy
Romanesque Revival church buildings in Italy